USS Fuller (DD-297) was a  built for the United States Navy during World War I.

Description
The Clemson class was a repeat of the preceding  although more fuel capacity was added. They had a crew of 6 officers and 108 enlisted men.

Performance differed radically between the ships of the class, often due to poor workmanship. The Clemson class was powered by two steam turbines, each driving one propeller shaft, using steam provided by four water-tube boilers.

The ships were armed with four 4-inch (102 mm) guns in single mounts and were fitted with two 1-pounder guns for anti-aircraft defense. In many ships a shortage of 1-pounders caused them to be replaced by 3-inch (76 mm) guns. Their primary weapon, though, was their torpedo battery of a dozen 21 inch (533 mm) torpedo tubes in four triple mounts. They also carried a pair of depth charge rails. A "Y-gun" depth charge thrower was added to many ships.

Construction and career
Fuller, the first Navy ship named for Marine Captain Edward Fuller, who was killed in the Battle of Belleau Wood, was launched 5 December 1918 by Bethlehem Shipbuilding Corporation, San Francisco, California; sponsored by Miss Gladys Sullivan; and commissioned on 28 February 1920. After a brief cruise to the Hawaiian Islands, Fuller arrived at her home port, San Diego, California, on 28 April 1920, and at once took up the schedule of training which took the Pacific destroyers along the west coast from California to Oregon. In February and March 1923, she joined in Battle Fleet maneuvers in the Panama Canal Zone, and returned to experimental torpedo firing and antiaircraft firing practice off San Diego.

In July 1923, with her division, she sailed north for maneuvers and repairs at Puget Sound Naval Shipyard. While making their homeward-bound passage from San Francisco, California to San Diego on the night of 8 September, the division went on the rocks at Point Honda when mistakes were made in positional calculations, causing the Honda Point Disaster in the foggy darkness. Fuller was abandoned, with all of her crew reaching safety.  The ship later broke in two and sank. She was decommissioned 26 October 1923.

Notes

References

External links

Clemson-class destroyers
Ships built in San Francisco
1918 ships
Shipwrecks of the California coast
Maritime incidents in September 1923